Starving in Suburbia (also sold under the title Thinspiration) is a 2014 American psychological drama made-for-television film about a high school student and competitive dancer, Hannah, who develops a severe eating disorder after becoming obsessed with a pro-ana forum on Tumblr that promotes self-starvation, as Hannah's family are preoccupied by her wrestler brother's upcoming tournament. The film stars Laura Wiggins, Brendan Meyer, Paula Newsome, Marcus Giamatti, Izabella Miko, Emma Dumont and Callie Thorne. It received mixed reviews from critics, while being noted for addressing two phenomenons previously unaddressed by made-for-television films: pro-ana websites, and anorexia among males.

Plot

Hannah and Leo are teenage siblings from a competitive family. Hannah takes classes in interpretive dancing, hoping to be at the forefront of an upcoming dance meet, while Leo's time is taken up mostly by wrestling, which requires him to make weight and undergo a strict regimen of diets and training. This focus on Leo leaves Hannah, 17 years old, largely up to her own devices. She works part-time at a doughnut shop, and spends time socially with her friends. One day, she and her best friend, Kayden, are browsing the internet in Hannah's bedroom when they accidentally come upon a pro-ana blog on Tumblr, which features multiple gifs of unnaturally-thin people, skeletons, cinematography from The Lovely Bones, and motivational quotes that mock fat people and offer tips on how to avoid eating. Kayden is briefly curious but soon becomes bothered by the blog and leaves it, closing Hannah's laptop. Hannah returns to the blog after Kayden leaves, and joins a forum featured there, which is moderated by the mysterious and enigmatic "ButterflyAna". Hannah envisions the forum's visitors in her mind as real people, all abnormally thin and attractive-looking, attending an exclusive club adorned with rainbow string lights for a party, but no food or drinks anywhere. "ButterflyAna" visually appears looking like supermodel Abbey Lee Kershaw, and relates to Hannah's inner feelings of poor self-esteem and concerns about things such as her weight, perceived stomach distention and eating too much.

At first, as Hannah begins to eat less and less, nobody takes notice. Her parents are mildly confused but initially do not care until her mother happens to walk in on Hannah and find the pro-ana blog open on her computer. Disturbed by it, she begins closely monitoring Hannah's internet browsing activity, while Hannah's father insists that this invasion of privacy is unnecessary if Hannah is not actively using the blog; to prove to her parents that she is eating, Hannah consumes a breakfast muffin in front of them. They are too occupied by Leo's upcoming wresting competition to focus on Hannah, and they urge Leo to make weight and keep his attention on winning. Meanwhile, Hannah's behaviour gets worse. Her friendships suffer, and she rudely insults her dance coach, Ms. Christie, who observes Hannah nearly fainting at a dance practice and forces her to stop attending the classes until she is willing to go to mental health counselling. At the doughnut shop, Hannah is told by her boss to dispose of a bag of half-eaten donuts that have gone stale in the dumpster. In a starvation-induced panic, Hannah rips open a garbage bag and eats most of the old donuts, only to then vomit them up. Hannah visits the forum and admits that she slipped up by eating the old donuts, but "ButterflyAna" is unsympathetic, chastising Hannah for gaining weight. She offers to "help" Hannah by making the younger girl her new "personal project", the ultimate epiphany of thinness, which Hannah readily accepts. The visual rainbow string light party club imagined by Hannah has deteriorated into a frightening, decayed backdrop with dark colours, and all the other Forum members swiftly flee the blog, fearing that their own parents will catch them there if Hannah's mother reports any of it. One forum member, who goes by "HipHopK" as their screen name, gives Hannah a serious warning to stay away from the pro-ana blog. Hannah assumes that Kayden is "HipHopK", but upon confronting Kayden with this accusation, Kayden argues that she has no idea who that person is, and also that she finds the pro-ana blog creepy.

Hannah's mother goes into Hannah's room to check on her, and discovers her daughter's bedroom walls covered in cutouts from magazines of thin supermodels and women in bikinis. She finds a strange number of moths fluttering around the room, accompanied by a pungent smell, and the curtains have been drawn closed, making the room extremely dark. Hannah's mother opens the bedroom closet and sobs hysterically when she discovers numerous dinner plates of moldy food hidden among Hannah's clothing. The moth caterpillars are feeding on the food and laying eggs there. Hannah comes home, looking haggard and pale, and she flies into a rage upon finding that her mother has gone through her room. She confronts her mother and begins to tear up the room in fury, but she then collapses and is taken to the hospital. Her parents' insurance coverage gives Hannah a brief number of inpatient counselling sessions, during which Hannah is forced to confront her mental illness. She realizes the physical damage that she has done to her body, and also realizes that "ButterflyAna" is not a real friend to her. After painting a picture of her anorexia as personified by a dark, sinister butterfly in black ink, which she hangs among similar artworks made by other minors suffering from eating disorders, Hannah is able to return home, in part because her parents' insurance will cover no further sessions at the hospital. Hannah is at risk for relapsing back into her old habits, and so her parents need to keep a close eye on her. Hannah tries to distract herself from the internet by going with her parents to attend Leo's wrestling competition at school. Leo nearly wins, but his opponent recoils in horror after Leo falls unconscious underneath him. When Leo is brought to the hospital, it is revealed that his heart has given out at that he is being kept on life support, showing no brain activity. Hannah's father is outraged at the suggestion from the doctor that Leo himself suffered from an eating disorder, arguing that "boys and athletes" don't suffer from such things. Hannah comes to the realization that Leo himself is the unknown "HipHopK" after discovering that her brother had carved the words "don't eat" on his own stomach, a "marking" that had been on the screen name's profile photo. Leo dies in the hospital, surrounded by his family. After Leo's death, Hannah is welcomed back to dance class by Ms. Christie, who hugs her and praises her for facing her illness. Hannah then seeks out the real "ButterflyAna", and finds a homeless adult woman who is living with self-induced starvation, hoarding decaying cosmetics and beauty supplies and keeping an old laptop computer with her. Strangely, the homeless woman does in fact appear to have a small house, but does not inhabit it at all; the house looks filthy and neglected. The homeless woman claims not to be "ButterflyAna", but finally admits the truth after hearing that "HipHopK" has died. She apologizes for the loss of Hannah's brother, and says that she didn't know the pro-ana blog was hurting other people. Hannah tells the homeless woman that she hopes she gets better soon and seeks help, after which she starts a self-esteem inspiration website in honour of Leo's memory, which contains only positive inspirational quotes and no pro-ana content at all.

Cast
 Laura Wiggins as Hannah
 Marcus Giamatti as Michael (Hannah's Father)
 Callie Thorne as Joey (Hannah's Mother)
 Emma Dumont as Kayden
 Brendan Meyer as Leo/HipHopK
 Izabella Miko as ButterflyAna
 Paula Newsome as Ms. Christie
 Luke Gregory Crosby as Leo's Teammate
 Olivia Jordan as Thin Chic Teen Magazine Woman

Reception
Starving in Suburbia received mixed reviews from critics. The Atlantic argued that the film was just repeating the same patterns as other predecessor eating disorder-themed films, and that the feature of pro-ana websites was just a nuance, stating, "recently, Lifetime aired Starving in Suburbia, a 2014 film that expanded the confines of the genre [eating disorder films] by including  a new scare factor: pro-anorexia (colloquially known as pro-ana) websites, which supposedly lure unsuspecting teens into starving themselves by encouraging anorexics to share their own tips and tricks. On the one hand, Americans are surprisingly educated about anorexia. Eighty-two percent of people surveyed in 2010 described eating disorders as a serious mental and physical illness, with only 12 percent dismissing them as afflictions of vanity. On the other, cultural portrayals of anorexia have become inextricable from the disease itself." Shana Vaid of Penn Moviegoer found the film problematic, but commended its feature of a male character with unrecognized anorexia, saying, "Starving in Suburbia is not a horrible movie; it is enjoyable to watch and is visually beautiful. It also isn't a total failure in spreading awareness of eating disorders, since it does feature a boy with an eating disorder whose disease is encouraged by his wrestling coach. Anorexia often goes unnoticed in boys and men because the illness is seen as feminine, so I do commend the film for spreading awareness of anorexia in males. However, its flaws outweigh its positive aspects. The artistic techniques it uses cause it to do the opposite of what it was intended to do. Rather than being a positive force in the movement to spread awareness of eating disorders and combat the stigma around them, the film instead romanticizes the illness, demonizes those who suffer from it, and misidentifies its causes."

Molly McAleer of Mother, May I Sleep With Podcast? was more positive, taking a comedic approach to the film, while arguing that it offered a "surprisingly accurate portrayal of Tumblr and classic Lifetime family disfunction". Kimberly Neil, a writer for Teen Vogue who had previously suffered from anorexia and a relapse into anorexia and laxative abuse after an esophageal tear, agreed that Starving in Suburbia, along with the book Wintergirls, are accurate in their portrayal of healing from anorexia as a chronic, unending process, stating, "healing from an eating disorder is almost as stigmatized in discussion as admitting the problem itself. From books like Wintergirls to movies like Starving in Suburbia, the media presents a consistent message that the process of healing is a continuous, upward journey. I cannot speak for everyone with an eating disorder. I can admit how difficult it has been to tell my story at times, because my illness comes and goes in waves. I’ve yet to experience recovery, full stop."

References

External links

2014 films
American psychological drama films
American psychological films
Films about mental health
Lifetime (TV network) films
American teen drama films
Films about eating disorders
Wrestling films
2010s American films